"Easy to Love" is a song recorded by Leo Sayer for the album Thunder in My Heart, and originally released as a single in 1977. It was co-written by Sayer with Albert Hammond.  It was the second single from the LP, the follow-up to the title track.

"Easy to Love" reached number 36 in the United States and number 35 in Canada.  It did best in New Zealand, where it spent 10 weeks in the Top 40 and peaked at number 19.

Reception
Cash Box magazine said "The second single from the Thunder in My Heart LP has a strong R&B/disco flavour to it and features the Sayer falsetto that has been so popular on his last two or three hits".

Personnel
Leo Sayer – vocals
Jeff Porcaro – drums
Ben Adkins – bass
Lee Ritenour – guitars
Ray Parker – guitars
Michael Omartian – piano
Bobbye Hall – percussion
David Paich – string section arranger and conductor

Chart history

Cover versions
The song was re-recorded in Spanish by singer Lani Hall as "Es Fácil Amar," and appeared as the title track of her 1985 Latin Grammy-winning album of the same name, produced by Hammond.
A French language version recorded in 1978 by Georges Thurston would later gain success in the early 1990s when 800,000 copies were sold in Europe.
Dutch musician Peter Hollestelle wrote new words to the composition of the song, and his band "Cashmere" had a Dutch Top Ten hit single in 1979 with its resulting song, "Love's What I Want".

References

External links
 

Leo Sayer songs
1977 songs
1977 singles
Warner Records singles
Songs written by Albert Hammond
Songs written by Leo Sayer
Song recordings produced by Richard Perry